Ibeas de Juarros is a municipality located in the province of Burgos, Castile and León, Spain. According to the 2004 census (INE), the municipality had a population of 1,192 inhabitants. 

The village is near the Archaeological site of Atapuerca, designated a World Heritage Site by UNESCO in 2000. Regional policy is to promote sustainable tourism in the villages surrounding the World Heritage Site, and there is a Site Access Centre (CAYAC) in Ibeas de Juarros.

References 

Municipalities in the Province of Burgos